One More Try is a 2012 Filipino romantic drama film starring Angel Locsin, Angelica Panganiban, Dingdong Dantes and Zanjoe Marudo. The film was one of the eight official entries to the 2012 Metro Manila Film Festival. The film was produced by Star Cinema and released on December 25, 2012.

One More Try became a blockbuster hit, where it was hailed as the second-top grosser of 2012 MMFF. The film earned numerous accolades. On the 38th Metro Manila Film Festival, the film won six awards including "Best Picture" and "Best Actor" for Dingdong Dantes. On the 29th PMPC Star Awards for Movies, Angel Locsin won the "Best Actress" award. On the 61st FAMAS Awards, the film won two acting awards including Best Actress award for Locsin.

Synopsis
Grace (Angel Locsin) is a single mother willing to sacrifice everything to save her ill son, Botchok (Miguel Vergara). Grace lives a good life with her son and supportive boyfriend, Tristan (Zanjoe Marudo). When Botchok’s rare blood disease became severe, Grace was forced to reconnect with Botchok’s biological father, Edward (Dingdong Dantes).  Edward, an accomplished man married to an equally successful Jacqueline (Angelica Panganiban), is uncomfortable with reconnecting with Grace.  Having no children of their own, Jacqueline gives her blessings for Edward to reconnect with Grace to help save their son.  The reconnection with Grace and Botchok starts to taint Edward and Jacqueline's marriage.

Cast

Angel Locsin as Grace
Angelica Panganiban as Jacqueline
Dingdong Dantes as Edward
Zanjoe Marudo as Tristan
Carmina Villaroel as Dra. Diesta
Agot Isidro as Marga
Gina Pareño as Lola Medy
Mel Kimura
Malou Crisologo
Edward Mendez as Archie
Ian Galliguez as Helper
Thou Reyes
Jose Sarasola
Miguel Vergara as Bochok

Production

Casting
Angel Locsin, one of the female leads, stated in an interview that she initially hesitated to accept the role of Grace. She had doubts if she could portray the role of a mother because she has yet to experience being a mother in real life.

Dingdong Dantes was cast as Edward. According to the director, Ruel S. Bayani, Dantes' acting performance in the horror film "Segunda Mano" (an MMFF movie entry garnering Dantes the best actor award) was one of the reasons why he was chosen for the role. Bayani added that they wanted to cast a new mix of actors for the film to give it a "different flavor". This film entry for the 38th MMFF marks Dingdong Dantes' second big screen project under Star Cinema after Segunda Mano.

Trailer
The films official trailer was released on Star Cinema's YouTube account on November 30, 2012.

Music
The film's theme song is Angeline Quinto's cover of "Without You", originally sung by Joey Albert.

Reception

Critical reception
The film was graded "A" by the Cinema Evaluation Board, and it received R-13 rating by the MTRCB.

Speculations surfaced about its uncanny similarity to the Chinese film In Love We Trust, released in 2007. Both movies have similar story lines. The initial booking title of "One More Try", per National Cinema Association of the Philippines, was "In Love We Trust".

Box office
One More Try opened at third place with a first-day gross of ₱8.8 million in Metro Manila and ₱4.8 million in provinces for a total of ₱13.6 million nationwide behind Sisterakas and Si Agimat, si Enteng Kabisote at si Ako, which opened in first and second place respectively. In the fourth day of showing, the film grossed with over ₱78 million which overtook Si Agimat, si Enteng Kabisote at si Ako which grossed over ₱69 million.

Television premiere
The film had its television premiere on October 27, 2013 in the cable channel Cinema One.

Accolades

Awards and nominations
The film was proclaimed Best Picture during the 38th Metro Manila Film Festival Awards night.

References

External links
 

2012 films
Philippine romantic drama films
2010s Tagalog-language films
Star Cinema films